Selbyggen (The Selbu Resident) is a local Norwegian newspaper covering the municipalities of Selbu and Tydal in Sør-Trøndelag county. The newspaper has been published since June 9, 1889, when it was started by the brothers John and Ola Aas, with a hiatus from 1941 to 1947. The newspaper is published every Friday. It is edited by Bodil Uthus.

Circulation
According to the Norwegian Audit Bureau of Circulations and National Association of Local Newspapers, Selbyggen has had the following annual circulation:
2004: 3,207
2005: 3,290
2006: 3,251
2007: 3,267
2008: 3,306
2009: 3,227
2010: 3,262
2011: 3,181
2012: 3,121
2013: 3,039
2014: 2,981
2015: 3,118
2016: 3,084

References

External links
Selbyggen homepage

Newspapers published in Norway
Norwegian-language newspapers
Selbu
Tydal
Mass media in Trøndelag
Newspapers established in 1889
1889 establishments in Norway